The  was a limited express Blue Train overnight sleeping car train service in Japan operated by Japanese National Railways (JNR) and later by West Japan Railway Company (JR West), which ran from  to  in Kagawa Prefecture in Shikoku until July 1998.

Rolling stock
In its latter years, the Seto service was operated using 24/25 series sleeping cars. The train was hauled by a JR East Tabata (Tokyo)-based EF65-1000 DC electric locomotive throughout.

History
From 15 March 1972, the train was upgraded to become a "limited express" service. In 1977, the 20 series sleeping cars were replaced by 24/25 series sleeping cars.

From the start of the revised timetable on 10 July 1998, the Seto services were discontinued and replaced by new 285 series electric multiple unit trains running as the Sunrise Seto together with the Sunrise Izumo.

See also
 Blue Train (Japan)

References

West Japan Railway Company
Named passenger trains of Japan
Night trains of Japan
Railway services introduced in 1950
Railway services discontinued in 1998

ja:瀬戸 (列車)